Wanquan is a town under the administration of Pingyang County, Zhejiang, China. , it has four residential communities, 62 villages, and two special farming communities under its administration.

References 

Township-level divisions of Zhejiang
Pingyang County